Charles West may refer to:
Charles Sackville-West, 4th Baron Sackville (1870–1962), British Army general and peer
Charles West, 5th Baron De La Warr (1626–1687), English nobleman
Charles Sackville-West, 6th Earl De La Warr (1815–1873), British soldier
Charles West (actor) (1885–1943), American silent film actor
Charles West (author) (born 1927), British crime mystery writer and actor
Charles West (MP), English Member of Parliament for Andover 1678–1679
Charles West (physician) (1816–1898), founder of London's Great Ormond Street Hospital
Charles A. West (1890–1957), American basketball and football coach, and college athletics administrator
Charles Dickinson West (1847–1908), Irish mechanical engineer and naval architect
Charles F. West (politician) (1895–1955), U.S. Representative from Ohio
Charles Fremont West (1899–1979), first African American to play quarterback in the Rose Bowl
Charles P. West (1921–2015), American state politician from Delaware
Charles S. West (1829–1885), Texas judge and politician
Major Charles West, son of John West III
Charlie West (born 1946), American football player
Charlie West (Australian footballer) (1884–1962), Australian rules footballer
Charles F. West (aviator) (1899–1972), pioneer aviator